Keffi is a town in Nasarawa State, Nigeria. Its headquarters are in the town of Keffi. Keffi is 50 kilometers from Abuja. Nasarawa State university is located in Keffi sitting along Keffi-Akwanga express way.

It has an area of 138 km and a population of about 92,664 at the 2006 census.  The postal code of the area is 961.

Keffi town was founded around 1802 by a Fulani warrior leader Abdu Zanga who took the title of emir. His small dominion was subject to the Zaria emirate to which it had to pay an annual tribute of slaves.

In 1902 Keffi was the location of an incident that led to the British invasion of Northern Nigeria, after the "magaji", a representative of the Zaria sultan killed a British officer. When the Magaji found refuge in Kano, this was the pretext for Lugard to invade the northern caliphate.

Notable people
 Imaan Sulaiman-Ibrahim – Director-General of NAPTIP

References

Local Government Areas in Nasarawa State